British Universities & Colleges Sport (BUCS) is the governing body for higher education sport in the United Kingdom. BUCS was formed in 2008 by a merger of the British Universities Sports Association (BUSA) and University College Sport (UCS) organisations. BUCS is responsible for organising more than 52 inter-university sports in the UK and representative teams for the World University Championships and the World University Games.

BUCS is a membership organisation for over 165 universities and colleges in the UK, with 6,000 teams competing across 850 leagues. Anne, Princess Royal is patron of BUCS.

Sports

BUCS has 52 sports represented within the leagues and events. They are:

American football
Archery
Athletics
Badminton
Baseball and softball
Basketball
Boxing
Canoeing
Clay pigeon shooting
Climbing
Cricket
Cycling
Diving 
Dodgeball
Equestrian
Fencing
Football
Futsal
Gaelic football
Golf
Gymnastics
Handball
Hockey
Jiu jitsu
Judo
Karate
Korfball
Lacrosse
Modern biathlon and pentathlon
Netball
Orienteering
Para powerlifting
Pool and snooker
Rifle
Rowing
Rugby league
Rugby union (including rugby sevens)
Sailing
Snowsports
Squash
Surfing
Swimming
Table tennis
Taekwondo
Tennis
Trampolining
Triathlon
Ultimate Frisbee
Volleyball
Water polo
Weightlifting
Wheelchair basketball
Windsurfing

Leagues, Competitions and Events
Team sports compete in BUCS leagues, with the majority of league fixtures taking place on Wednesday afternoons, which is commonly referred to as BUCS Wednesday. Wednesday afternoons are generally free from lectures to allow students to compete in sport. There are 850 leagues, with institutions across the country competing against each other to avoid relegation or win the league and gain promotion to higher leagues.

The finals of the Championship and Trophy are played at BUCS Big Wednesday. This annual single-day event showcases the Championship and Trophy finals across 16 league sports.  the Big Wednesday takes place at the University of Nottingham.

BUCS Nationals is an annual multisport event that takes place across three days. Indoor athletics, swimming, badminton, fencing, judo, karate, rifle and climbing are the sports represented at BUCS Nationals.  the Nationals are held in Sheffield.

Over the year, BUCS runs over 120 events for both individual and team sports.

BUCS Points
BUCS Points are given to institutions depending on where they finish in leagues and events. The accumulation of these points determine which institution becomes overall BUCS Champion.

Loughborough University have won the BUCS competition 42 years in a row up until the 2021–2022 season. Both the 2019–20 and 2020–21 seasons were not completed due to COVID.

BUCS Super Rugby

BUCS Super Rugby is the highest level of men's university rugby in Britain and a potential pathway for university players into elite rugby. The tournament launched in 2016–17 with eight teams, before expanding to nine teams in 2017-18 and ten teams in 2019–20.

The season has two main phases:
 A double round-robin, where teams play each other home and away (known as the BUCS Super Rugby League).
 A knockout tournament featuring the top eight teams from the League (known as the BUCS Super Rugby Championship).

International/GB Students
Members of both FISU (International University Sport Federations) and EUSA (European University Sports Association), BUCS is responsible for sending a cohort of students to international events including the World University Summer & Winter Games and the European University Games. The British international team goes by the name of GB Students.

National governing body involvement
BUCS applies for annual funding from Sports England to support the delivery of student sport across the country. They also work with national governing bodies to develop sports within the student sector and some posts within BUCS are funded by governing bodies, with the aim of developing the specific sport for students.

The Football Association fund projects and positions within BUCS to help develop grassroots football. With their investment, BUCS set up 62 Football Grassroot Hubs to support Football and Futsal in the higher education sector, benefiting just under 70,000 participants. BUCS and The FA also joined to create the Women's Leadership Programme, providing students with important skills and qualities to help them in their future careers whether that is in the football and sporting sector or not. The first cohort of leaders graduated in 2020.

Board
The BUCS Board is responsible for leading strong governance and strategic leadership within the sector. The Board is made up of the chair, seven independent directors and two BUCS directors - one representing students and the other representing the senior staff of the membership.

Chair of the Board: 
Professor Craig Mahoney

Commercial and marketing director: 
Andy Westlake

Governance and Legal Director: 
Jenny Agnew

Physical Health & Activity Director: 
Born Barikor

Inclusion Director: 
Josef Baines

Sport and Competition Director: 
Katy Storie

Professional & Workforce Director: 
Nigel Wallace

Finance Director: 
Simon Wilson

Chair of BUCS Senior Managers Executive: 
Cathy Gallagher

Student Director: 
Madeleine Cannell

Hall of Fame
In 2019, BUCS introduced the Hall of Fame to celebrate the centenary of British university sport. The Hall of Fame acknowledges individual's dedication and achievements in sport. Members of the Hall of Fame include:

Alison Odell CBE 
Bill Slater CBE 
Christine Ohuruogu MBE 
Dame Jessica Ennis-Hill 
Dame Katherine Grainger DBE 
Danielle Brown MBE 
Dr Deng Yaping 
Eric Liddell 
Liz Nicholl CBE 
Sir Gareth Edwards CBE 
Sir Roger Bannister CH CBE

See also
International University Sports Federation
Scottish Universities Sport
Colleges & Universities Sports Association of Ireland
National Collegiate Athletic Association
U Sports

References

External links
 Official website

European members of the FISU
Physical education in the United Kingdom
Sport in the London Borough of Southwark
University
Sports organizations established in 2008
 
Student sports governing bodies
2008 establishments in the United Kingdom
University and college sports